The Bristol Virginia-Tennessee Slogan Sign is a landmark in the twin cities of Bristol, Virginia and Bristol, Tennessee, United States.  The sign is positioned over State Street, a roadway along the border separating the two states.  Although the landmark is technically located in both Tennessee and Virginia, the National Register considers the location as Tennessee.

History
In 1901, the center of Main Street was officially designated as the state line separating Tennessee and Virginia by the United States Congress.  The street has since been renamed State Street.

According to the Bristol Historical Association's booklet The Historical Bristol Sign, the Bristol Gas and Electric Company donated and erected the sign atop a hardware store in 1910 to advertise the city.  The sign originally contained the lighted slogan PUSH! - THAT'S BRISTOL referring to the hopes of continued growth and future prosperity for the two cities.  In 1915, the sign was moved to its current location.  In 1921, a contest was held in order to select a new slogan.  The winning slogan, A GOOD PLACE TO LIVE, has remained the slogan ever since.  The sign is featured at the beginning of a 2016 commercial for GEICO insurance.

It was listed on the National Register of Historic Places in 1988.

Technical details
The lighted sign currently contains 1,332 light bulbs.

References

Sign History from City of Bristol Website

Commercial buildings on the National Register of Historic Places in Tennessee
Buildings and structures on the National Register of Historic Places in Virginia
Buildings and structures completed in 1910
National Register of Historic Places in Bristol, Virginia
Bristol, Tennessee
Bristol, Virginia
Buildings and structures in Bristol, Virginia
Individual signs in the United States
Buildings and structures in Sullivan County, Tennessee
Individual signs on the National Register of Historic Places
1910 establishments in Tennessee
1910 establishments in Virginia